is a Japanese manga is written and illustrated by Tamayo Akiyama. The manga is licensed for an English-language release in North America by Tokyopop, licensed for a French-language release in France.

Reception
Mania.com's Jarred Pine	criticises the manga for its lack of "mystery solving" and thinks that the "horror" genre for the book is mis-tagged. IGN's A.E. Sparrow commends the book for its art.

References

External links

2006 manga
Adventure anime and manga
Horror anime and manga
Shōjo manga
Tamayo Akiyama
Tokyopop titles